Wickes is a publicly listed home improvement retailer based in the UK.

Wickes may also refer to:

Companies
 Wickes Furniture, a former US-based furniture store chain
 Wickes Companies, a defunct company, later called Collins & Aikman

Places
 Wix, Essex (archaic spelling), England

United States
 Wickes, Arkansas, a city
 Wickes, Missouri
 Wickes, Montana, a ghost town

Ships
 Wickes-class destroyer
 USS Wickes (DD-75)
 USS Wickes (DD-578)

Other uses
 Wickes (surname)
 Wickes Stadium, a football stadium in Michigan, United States
 Wickes High School, Wickes, Arkansas

See also
 Wicks (disambiguation)
 Wix (disambiguation)